Timothy Carter (born 24 June 1944) is a New Zealand field hockey player. He competed in the men's tournament at the 1964 Summer Olympics.

References

External links
 

1944 births
Living people
New Zealand male field hockey players
Olympic field hockey players of New Zealand
Field hockey players at the 1964 Summer Olympics
Field hockey players from Whangārei